Omakere is a farming settlement in the Central Hawke's Bay District and Hawke's Bay Region of New Zealand's North Island. It is located east of Waipawa.

Ōmakere translates as place (Ō) someone was lost or died (makere).

The Omakere Church includes a stained glass memorial wall, depicting Jesus Christ's crucifixion, in memory of three local men who died in war.

The Omakere and neighbouring Elsthorpe rugby union teams were featured in a New Zealand television advertisement for coverage of the 2019 Rugby World Cup.

Demographics

Mangarara had a population of 2,400 at the 2018 New Zealand census, an increase of 324 people (15.6%) since the 2013 census, and an increase of 399 people (19.9%) since the 2006 census. There were 900 households, comprising 1,200 males and 1,200 females, giving a sex ratio of 1.0 males per female. The median age was 44.6 years (compared with 37.4 years nationally), with 513 people (21.4%) aged under 15 years, 282 (11.8%) aged 15 to 29, 1,197 (49.9%) aged 30 to 64, and 411 (17.1%) aged 65 or older.

Ethnicities were 85.6% European/Pākehā, 20.9% Māori, 1.9% Pacific peoples, 1.0% Asian, and 2.2% other ethnicities. People may identify with more than one ethnicity.

The percentage of people born overseas was 12.4, compared with 27.1% nationally.

Although some people chose not to answer the census's question about religious affiliation, 53.5% had no religion, 36.0% were Christian, 1.2% had Māori religious beliefs, 0.2% were Hindu, 0.1% were Muslim and 1.4% had other religions.

Of those at least 15 years old, 294 (15.6%) people had a bachelor's or higher degree, and 423 (22.4%) people had no formal qualifications. The median income was $32,900, compared with $31,800 nationally. 249 people (13.2%) earned over $70,000 compared to 17.2% nationally. The employment status of those at least 15 was that 1,023 (54.2%) people were employed full-time, 291 (15.4%) were part-time, and 48 (2.5%) were unemployed.

Education
Omakere School is a Year 1-8 co-educational state primary school.

References

Central Hawke's Bay District
Populated places in the Hawke's Bay Region